The 2001 Towson Tigers football team was an American football team that represented Towson University during the 2001 NCAA Division I-AA football season. Towson finished sixth in the Patriot League.

In their 10th year under head coach Gordy Combs, the Tigers compiled a 3–7 record. 

The Tigers were outscored 257 to 149. Their 2–5 conference record placed sixth out of eight in the Patriot League standings. 

Like most of the Patriot League, Towson played just 10 of its 11 scheduled regular season games, after its September 15 matchup, against Ivy League opponent Yale, was canceled following the September 11 attacks. 

Towson played its home games at Minnegan Stadium on the university campus in Towson, Maryland.

Schedule

References

Towson
Towson Tigers football seasons
Towson Tigers football